is a yaoi manga series written and illustrated by You Higuri. The series is about the relationship between a man from a poor noble family and a master thief during the Victorian Era in France.

Characters

Main characters

Florian 
Florian is the last heir of an impoverished noble family. He is 20 years old. He has blond hair and stunning violet eyes, which resemble amethysts. He agrees to be sold to Noir in return for the money to pay his family's debts.

Count Ray Balzac Courland/Noir 
Ray Balzac Courland is a master thief who calls himself "Noir". He lives as an usurer under the name "Count Ray Balzac Courland". He is 18 years old. He prefers to use a whip as a weapon.

Laila 
Laila is Noir's right-hand woman. She is in love with him, and a little jealous of his relationship with Florian.

Solomon Sugar 
Solomon Sugar is a private investigator who is determined to expose Noir's true identity. He gave a nickname to Noir and calls him his "black cat".

Noel 'Petit Noel' Tassel 
Noel is the five-year-old son of Monsieur Tassel. His parents and Florian call him "Petit Noel". He becomes instantly attached to Florian due to Florian's resemblance to his mother. Noel always carries a teddy bear named "Betty Deux", which he calls his treasure. The teddy bear actually contains jewels his father hid there for safekeeping.

Louise Mastroianni/Louise Tassel 
Louise is the female head of the Black Hand's Paris branch. She is originally Italian. She is married to Monsieur Tassel and is mistress to Romwell Sr, Azura's father.

Azura/Romwell Jr 
Azura is the blood brother of Noir. He is secretly the head of several criminal organizations, including the Black Hand.

Minor characters

Monsieur Tassel 
Monsieur Tassel is Noel's father and the president of the Bank Tassel du Paris. Louise is his second wife, his first having died several years before.

Maurice 
Maurice is Florian's uncle. He attempts to murder Florian's mother and steal the Flame of Mughal. He is killed in the process of stealing the jewel.

Manon 
Manon is Maurice's lover. She joins him in his nefarious plans and is killed along with him in the process.

Florian's Mother 
Florian's Mother is a noblewoman who is forced to sell her treasured family heirlooms to pay off the family's debts. She is presumed to have died in the fire that consumed the family's mansion.

Release
, written and illustrated by You Higuri, was published into four volumes under Shueisha's Eyes Comics imprint line from October 25, 1999 to September 25, 2002. Tokyopop licensed it for an English translation in North America, releasing the volumes between February 2006 and February 2007 through its Blu Manga line. On April 24, 2004, Gentosha released a one-shot titled  on its Birz Comics Girl's Collection line. Digital Manga Publishing translated Galaxy into English and published it on July 19, 2006. Under the same line of Galaxy, Gentosha released  into two volumes on June 24, 2011.  has been serialized in Web Spica and Comic Spica magazines since August 2010. Gentosha released the first tankōbon volume on January 24, 2013.

Kurayami no Bitoku

Galaxy

La Esperanza

Ao no Karanku

References

External links
The series on Blu Manga's Site
Team Bonet's Gorgeous Carat Shrine
Sequential Tart review
Graphic Novel Reporter review
IGN review

1999 manga
Digital Manga Publishing titles
Gentosha manga
Yaoi anime and manga
Shueisha manga
Tokyopop titles
You Higuri